Brian Webb (born January 15, 1945) is a graphic designer and director of Webb & Webb Design Limited.

Brian Webb initially trained as a technical illustrator at Liverpool College of Art but quickly discovered words as well as pictures and moved on to Canterbury with the intention of working in television. Side-tracked again, he became seduced by ink and paper while involved with the college private press.

He moved to London and in 1971 he founded Trickett & Webb with Lynn Trickett. Projects included corporate, exhibition and packaging design for international clients, winning numerous awards around the world including New York Art Directors, Communication Arts USA, Packaging Design Council USA, Museum of Toyama Japan, Red Dot Germany, D&AD and Design Week. His work is in many permanent collections including V&A, London and MoMA, New York and has been exhibited extensively including Communicate: Independent British Graphic Design since the Sixties (Barbican Art Gallery, London 2004).

Brian Webb has lectured, assessed students and courses in the UK and abroad, was a Fellow and Past-President of the Chartered Society of Designers and committee and jury member of D&AD; Fellow of the University College of the Creative Arts (now the University for the Creative Arts), Visiting Professor University of the Arts London, Royal Society of the Arts Student Design Bursary judge for 25 years, he has also judged the Prince Philip Designers Prize.

For the University of the Arts he has curated exhibitions and designed catalogues for Sir Peter Blake's Sculpture and Commercial Art shows in 2003–4, and for Camberwell press edited and designed Submarine Dream Eric Ravilious’ wartime lithographs (1996) and A Thousand Years A Thousand Words, a celebration of Royal Mail Millennium Stamp project, 2000. He curated the Edward Bawden and Eric Ravilious Design Centenary exhibition for the Fry Art Gallery Saffron Walden and is co-author with Peyton Skipwith and format designer of the Design series of books, featuring the work of artists/designers, including from 2005 Eric Ravilious, Edward Bawden, Paul and John Nash, Edward McKnight Kauffer, David Gentleman, Curwen Press, Peter Blake and Lovat Fraser.

In 2008 Webb was elected as Master of the Art Workers' Guild. Published in 2008 was London Transport Posters, a Century of Art and Design published by Lund Humphries, including The Roller Coaster Ride, the chapter covering 1945 to the present day and in 2010 Think of it as a Poster, for the Fleece Press.

Recent work at Webb & Webb include postage stamps for the Royal Mail, exhibition, posters and book design for Bond Bound: Ian Fleming and the Art of Cover Design, the exhibition starting at the Fleming Collection Gallery in London 2008 and traveling to the US, Japan and Dubai and the 10th Anniversary re-design of the Harry Potter book series for Bloomsbury, 2010.

Books
Design: Edward Bawden and Eric Ravilious by Brian Webb and Peyton Skipwith, Antique Collectors' Club Ltd (1 September 2005). (978-1851495009)
Design: Paul Nash and John Nash by Brian Webb and Peyton Skipwith, Antique Collectors' Club Ltd (15 April 2007) edition (15 August 2006). (978-1851495191)
Design: E McKnight Kauffer by Brian Webb and Peyton Skipwith, Antique Collectors' Club Ltd (15 April 2007). (978-1851495207)
Design: Harold Curwen and Oliver Simon; Curwen Press by Brian Webb and Peyton Skipwith, Antique Collectors' Club Ltd (15 November 2008). (978-1851495719)
Design: David Gentleman by Brian Webb and Peyton Skipwith, Antique Collectors' Club Ltd (1 March 2009). (978-1851495955)
Design: Peter Blake by Brian Webb and Peyton Skipwith, Antique Collectors' Club Ltd (29 October 2010). (978-1851496181)
Design : Claud Lovat Fraser  by Brian Webb and Peyton Skipwith, Antique Collectors' Club Ltd (26 October 2011). (978-1851496631)
Design: FHK Henrion by Brian Webb and Ruth Artmonsky, Antique Collectors' Club Ltd (26 October 2011). (978-1851496327)
Design: Abram Games by Brian Webb and Naomi Games, Antique Collectors' Club Ltd (25 April 2012). (978-1851496778)
Design: John Piper by Brian Webb and Peyton Skipwith, Antique Collectors' Club Ltd (12 June 2013). (978-1851497287)
Design: Enid Marx by Brian Webb and Ruth Artmonsky, Antique Collectors' Club Ltd (8 November 2013). (978-1851497522)
Edward Bawden's London by Brian Webb and Peyton Skipwith, V & A Publishing (3 October 2011). (978-1851776559)
Edward Bawden's Kew Gardens by Brian Webb and Peyton Skipwith, V & A Publishing (7 April 2014). (978-1851777792)

References

 
 Simplicity and strength, The Spectator, June 9, 2007
 University for the Creative Arts Alumni
 Artworkers Guild membership
 V&A Museum London Prints, Drawings and Paintings Collection

External links 
 Webb & Webb Design Limited

Living people
English graphic designers
Place of birth missing (living people)
Artists from London
Masters of the Art Worker's Guild
1945 births